Wisdom Agblexo (born 11 November 1986, in Tema) is a Ghanaian footballer, playing for Sime Darby F.C. in Malaysia.

Career
Agblexo left after one and a half-year El-Olympi, he signed on 4 July 2008 a three years contract with Lierse S.K. He has moved from his club Lierse S.K. to help Lierse S.K's sister club Wadi Degla Sporting Club fight for promotion to Egyptian Premisership.

References

External links
 Footgoal Profile

Power F.C. players
Ghanaian footballers
Expatriate footballers in Egypt
Lierse S.K. players
People from Tema
Expatriate footballers in Belgium
1986 births
Living people
Ghanaian expatriate sportspeople in Belgium
Heart of Lions F.C. players
Ghanaian expatriate sportspeople in Egypt
Wadi Degla SC players
Expatriate footballers in Lebanon
Al Ansar FC players
Expatriate footballers in Malaysia
Ghanaian expatriate sportspeople in Malaysia
Sime Darby F.C. players
Challenger Pro League players
Association football forwards
Ghanaian expatriate footballers
Ghanaian expatriate sportspeople in Lebanon
Lebanese Premier League players